London's architectural heritage involves many architectural styles from different historical periods. London's architectural eclecticism stems from its long history, continual redevelopment, destruction by the Great Fire of London and The Blitz, and state recognition of private property rights which have limited large scale state planning. This sets London apart from other European capitals such as Paris and Rome which are more architecturally homogeneous. London's architecture ranges from the Romanesque central keep of The Tower of London, the great Gothic church of Westminster Abbey, the Palladian royal residence Queen's House, Christopher Wren's Baroque masterpiece St Paul's Cathedral, the High Victorian Gothic of The Palace of Westminster, the industrial Art Deco of Battersea Power Station, the post-war Modernism of The Barbican Estate and the Postmodern skyscraper 30 St Mary Axe 'The Gherkin'.

After the Roman withdrawal from Britain in the 5th century, the layout of the Roman settlement governed the plan of the Saxon and medieval city. This core of London is known as the City of London, while Westminster, the ancient centre of political power, lies to the west. Relatively few medieval structures survive due to the city's near-total destruction in the Great Fire of 1666, with exceptions such as the Tower of London, Westminster Abbey, Westminster Hall, Guildhall, St James's Palace, Lambeth Palace and some Tudor buildings. After the Great Fire, London was rebuilt and greatly modernised under the direction of the baroque architect Sir Christopher Wren, with the new St Paul's Cathedral as its centrepiece.

After a period of dramatic expansion in the 18th and 19th centuries, London reached its zenith as the world's largest and populous city from 1831 to 1925, becoming the capital of the British Empire at its greatest extent and power. In this period London sprawled vastly beyond its historical boundaries, absorbing many formerly rural settlements and creating vast suburbs. The city was further transformed by the Industrial Revolution as infrastructure projects like the West India Docks, the Regent's Canal, intercity railway termini like Paddington Station and the world's first underground railway system set London apart as the pre-eminent city of the industrial age. After suffering significant destruction during the Blitz of World War II and a period of economic decline in the post-war period, London is once again a global capital of culture and commerce, with much new development adding to its eclectic cityscape.

Throughout most of London's history, the height of buildings has been restricted. These restrictions gradually eroded in the post-war period (except those protecting certain views of St Paul's Cathedral). High rise buildings have become ever more numerous since, particularly in the 21st century. Skyscrapers are now numerous in the City of London financial district and Canary Wharf: a new financial district created in the 1980s and 90s in the former London docklands area of the Isle of Dogs. Recent tall buildings include the 1980s skyscraper Tower 42, the radical Lloyd's building by Richard Rogers, One Canada Square: the centre piece of the Canary Wharf district and 30 St Mary Axe (nicknamed the "Gherkin") which has set a precedent for other recent high-rise developments built in a similar high-tech style. Renzo Piano's The Shard completed in 2012 is the tallest building in London and for many years in the European Union, as well as the sixth-tallest building in Europe and the 96th-tallest building in the world

Prehistoric

Although no pre-Roman settlement is known, there were prehistoric crossing points at Deptford and Vauxhall Bridge, and some prehistoric remains are known from archaeology of the River Thames. It is likely that the course of Watling Street follows a more ancient pathway. Ancient Welsh legend claims the city of the Trinovantes – dedicated to the god Lud (Caer Llud) – was founded by the followers of Brân the Blessed, whose severed head is said to be buried under the White Tower facing the continent.

Roman London (60–500 CE)

Londinium was initially founded as a military trading port, while the first capital of the province was at Camulodunum. But after the Boudican Revolt of 61, when both cities were razed to the ground, the capital was removed to London, which rapidly grew to pre-eminence with the establishment of a Forum and a provincial Praetorium. The city was originally laid out to a classical plan like many other cities in Britannia and throughout Europe, in a roughly rectangular form with the south side formed by the River Thames, and divided into blocks of insulae. Two east–west streets (now Cheapside and Lower Thames Street) led from Newgate and Ludgate to form the cardo, presumably leading to a lost gate (or gates) at the present location of the Tower of London with the road to Canterbury and Dover. An extension of Watling Street formed the decumanus maximus, crossing the river from Billingsgate over the ancient London Bridge to Southwark and the south coast road beyond. The Forum was located at the current site of Leadenhall Market, and is said to have been the largest building north of the Alps in ancient times; remains can still be visited in the basement of some of the market shops.

The rectangular walled and gridded city was soon extended to the west over the River Walbrook, north towards marshy Moorfields and east to the area later known as Minories. A Romano-British tomb sculpture of an eagle was found there in 2013, suggesting that the Minories lay outside the city boundary in the early second century. Part of the amphitheatre remains beneath the London Guildhall square; a Roman bathing complex is accessible in the basement of 100 Lower Thames Street. The square Castrum was located at the north-east of the city at the Barbican, close to the Museum of London where part of the Roman London Wall remains. For centuries afterward, distances from London were reckoned from the London Stone, once claimed to be a fragment of masonry from the ancient Thames-side Praetorium. Late Roman private houses of leading Christians are thought to have been the foundation of the earliest churches; mosaic remains in the crypt at All Hallows by the Tower and perhaps some at St Paul's Cathedral.

The Middle Ages (1066–1603) 

Little remains of London's medieval architecture due to the city's near-complete destruction in The Great Fire of 1666 but a few scattered survivors, as well as other records, provide a vivid picture of the city in this period. In the Middle Ages, London lay predominantly within the boundaries of its Roman city walls – the area now known as The City of London – with Westminster being a separate smaller settlement to the west. By the 16th century there was moderate development outside the city walls – along river frontage of the Strand, in Lincoln's Inn Fields, and in Smithfield – and on the south bank of the Thames at Southwark, with London Bridge connecting the district to the rest of London. The earliest record of London bridge dates from the 10th century, a structure probably built of wood, but the best-known incarnation was constructed between 1176 and 1209. This was a stone bridge 900 ft wide with 19 arches, complete with its own street of shops, houses, a chapel and a drawbridge in the centre to allow large boat traffic to pass through. With only one bridge, the river Thames was the main means of transportation within the city, as well as providing access to overseas trade by sea; many wharves and quays lined its north bank.

Norman and Gothic 

Many of medieval London's most significant structures were initially constructed by the Normans, who recognised the importance of architecture as a means of demonstrating their power and of subordinating the native Saxon population after their conquest of England. The Norman conquest was a major turning point in the history of English architecture as they brought with them a new European Romanesque style and a greater architectural ambition than their Saxon predecessors. Almost immediately after their conquest of England the Normans built several fortresses along the River Thames in the centre of London to consolidate their power within the city, especially the Tower of London which survives today. The White Tower; the central keep of the Tower of London complex, was completed in the 1080s in the Romanesque style and would have been the tallest building in the city; it served as a royal residence for William the Conqueror. A key element of The White Tower is the chapel of St John's, one of the oldest and least altered Romanesque churches in England, built inside the fortification. The only other surviving Romanesque church in central London is St Bartholomew-the-Great in Smithfield, the remains of a much larger priory church. The Tower of London complex was greatly extended over the centuries with the addition of two outer defensive walls, with the complex reaching its current format by the end of the 13th century.

Another significant London structure initially constructed by the Normans was Westminster Hall. Completed in 1097 in the reign of William II as a royal residence, the hall become the foundation of the Palace of Westminster, a complex which gradually expanded throughout the Middle Ages and eventually served as the home of England's parliament. The hall was radically altered in the reign of Richard II in the 14th century becoming the largest such hall in medieval Europe. In Richard II's expansion an exceptionally wide span hammerbeam roof was added, now considered a marvel of medieval engineering, while the Norman outer walls were retained with the addition of gothic windows. Westminster Hall survives, having escaped the fire of 1834 which destroyed the majority of the medieval Palace of Westminster. It was incorporated into Barry and Pugin's neo-gothic Palace of Westminster; they admired its authentic gothic style. Other surviving examples of medieval halls in London can be found in Guildhall (1440) which once served as London's city hall (greatly altered after the great fire) and the Old Hall of Lincoln's Inn (1492) which retains its hammerbeam roof.

The Normans began the construction of Old St Paul's Cathedral on Ludgate Hill, replacing a primitive Saxon timber-framed building. By the time of its completion in the 14th century the cathedral included elements of Gothic architecture, such as an ornate rose window at the east end, alongside the Romanesque nave constructed by the Normans. The cathedral was latterly completely destroyed in the Great Fire of London of 1666 and replaced by Christopher Wren's St Paul's Cathedral which retained the medieval cathedral's Latin cross layout.

London's other major church, Westminster Abbey, was first constructed in the reign of Edward the Confessor in the Romanesque style. It was rebuilt in the Gothic style in the 13th century in the reign of Henry III, producing the building which largely survives today. The architecture of the abbey is reminiscent of French Cathedrals like Reims rather than the English Gothic of the period, leading to speculation that the master mason was French.  The most significant later addition to the abbey was the Henry VII Chapel. Built in the late 15th to early 16th century in late English Gothic style, it has an ornate fan vaulted ceiling. The twin-towered west front of the abbey was added in the 18th century to the designs of Nicholas Hawksmoor, utilising a faithful Neo-Gothic style intended to be in keeping with the rest of the building. Other significant Gothic churches surviving from the Middle Ages include Southwark Cathedral: a former priory that was the first gothic church in London, Temple Church (13th century) a rare round Knights Templar church, as well as a few city churches that survived The Great Fire like St Andrew Undershaft, St Helen's Bishopsgate, St Olave's Hart Street and St Sepulchre-without-Newgate.

Tudor and vernacular 

The Tudor period was a period of rapid expansion for London, both economically through growing overseas trade and in terms of population which grew dramatically from roughly 50,000 in 1500 to 250,000 in 1600. As a result, the city grew considerably, and by the end of the 16th century, the majority of London's population lived outside the city walls for the first time. Henry VII and Henry VIII commissioned a substantial number of royal works in this period, notably the extension and construction of several palaces including the massive Palace of Whitehall that stretched all the way from Westminster Hall to Charing Cross, the extravagant Nonsuch Palace in Greenwich and St James's Palace which still partially survives today. By far the most substantial remaining Tudor palace in Greater London is Hampton Court Palace, originally built for Cardinal Wolsey and then later becoming a residence of Henry VIII. Greatly extended by Christopher Wren in the late 17th century, the palace still retains most of its original Tudor architecture with its original 16th-century great hall, chapel, astronomical clock and gatehouses; it is often regarded as one of the finest example of Tudor Architecture in England. Henry VIII influenced the current form of central London by establishing the hunting grounds of Hyde Park, Green Park and St James's Park, which give London its exceptionally green city centre.

A significant development of Tudor architecture was the increased use of red brick, which became more readily available due to technical innovations in the late 15th century. Examples of this can be seen in the form of Bruce Castle (c.early 16th century): believed to be one of the oldest brick houses in England, the gatehouse of Lambeth Palace (1495) and St James's Palace (1536). Tudor architecture is most closely associated with its distinctive vernacular buildings which were typically timber framed and filled with wattle and daub giving the building a black and white 'checkerboard' appearance. Most commercial and residential buildings in London before the Great Fire had this form. Only a tiny handful of such buildings survive, including Staple Inn: an Inn of Chancery of the Tudor period, 41 Cloth Fair: central London's oldest house started in 1597 and Prince Henry's Room: a timber-framed jettied townhouse built in 1610. Although the vast majority of such structures were destroyed in the Great Fire, many timber-framed houses did, in fact, survive until as late as the late 19th and early 20th centuries but were demolished to make way for new development. An example is the demolition of Wych Street in the Edwardian period to make way for Kingsway, a new road between the Strand and High Holborn.

Stuart London: Inigo Jones and the rise of Classicism (1603–1666) 

The early Stuart period saw the late arrival of the classical style, a century after its appearance in Italy in the late 15th and early 16th centuries. The pre-eminent architect was Inigo Jones, appointed Surveyor of the King's Works in 1615. Having travelled around Italy and owning a copy of I quattro libri dell'architettura by Andrea Palladio, Jones was one of the first English architects to be influenced by classical architecture, both of classical antiquity and the revival of the style epitomised by Palladio. His first completed major work in inner London was Banqueting House, Whitehall (1622), an extension to the mostly medieval Palace of Whitehall, with a Palladian Portland stone facade and a fine painted ceiling by the Flemish painter Rubens. As the first truly classical building in London – a then primitive predominantly timber-framed medieval city – it is a significant building in the history of London's Architecture, described by Eric de Mare as:

"an architectural innovation that must have startled Londoners with its sophisticated Palladian Masonry, for its main façades containing rhythmical rows of tall windows, carved decorations and classical pilasters, all in mathematically, carefully proportioned precision, must have seemed to them like a stage set than a building."

Another royal commission Queen's House, Greenwich was completed in 1633 and again shows Jones's purist Palladian style that did not mirror the exuberant Baroque fashionable in mainland Europe. Perhaps Jones' most significant architectural commission was the redevelopment of Covent Garden. In 1630 Jones was commissioned by the Earl of Bedford to redevelop the area in the west of the city with fine houses to attract wealthy tenants. Between 1630 and 1633 Jones designed and constructed London's first modern square; a classical style piazza lined with colonnaded terraced houses and the Church of St Paul on the western side: the first church in London built in a classical style, with a monumental Tuscan portico. The piazza became a blueprint for the fashionable squares built across the West End of London in the Georgian era and the Church of St Paul was an architectural blueprint for the baroque city churches built by Wren after the Great Fire. The outbreak of the English Civil War in 1642 greatly interrupted building activity in England and after the parliamentarian victory Jones was heavily fined due to his close connections to Charles I. He later died in poverty in 1652. His London works the Banqueting House, Queen's House, St Paul's Covent Garden and Queen's Chapel all survive to this day. Lindsey House (1640) on Lincolns Inn Fields, a very early Palladian townhouse, is possibly by Jones. Despite his short architectural career and few surviving works, Jones's introduction of classical architecture to England is one of the most significant milestones in English architectural history.

Baroque London: The Great Fire and Christopher Wren's Reconstruction (1666–1714) 

The Great Fire in 1666 destroyed almost 90% of the largely medieval city, including a total of 13,500 houses, 87 parish churches, 44 Company Halls, the Royal Exchange, the Custom House, Old St Paul's Cathedral, the Bridewell Palace and other City prisons, the General Letter Office, and three city gates; Ludgate, Newgate, and Aldersgate. Although the Great Fire is considered to be a cataclysmic event in the history of London, the enormous destruction it caused presented a historic opportunity to replan and modernise the predominantly medieval city. Radical classical style reconstruction plans were quickly drawn up by architects such as Christopher Wren which proposed to completely discard the city's chaotic medieval street plan in favour of a rationalised grid system with wide boulevards, piazzas and a uniform classical style for all new buildings. However, due to a shortage of labour necessary to complete such grandiose plans, complications with redistributing and compensating property that had been lost in the fire, and the intense urgency of rebuilding the city, it was decided to rebuild the city around the original medieval street plan. London nonetheless witnessed a radical architectural transformation. Perhaps the most striking characteristic of the new city was its architectural uniformity. In 1667, Charles II specified that all new houses were to be built to a uniform height and plot size, as well all being built of brick rather than wood to reduce fire hazard. As a result, the chaotic streets of overhanging timber-framed houses of medieval and Stuart London were replaced with neat rows of uniformly proportioned brick terraces. A good surviving example of the kind of simple brick terraces built immediately after the fire is King's Bench Walk in the Inner Temple; it became a blueprint for the Georgian terraced house.

St Paul's Cathedral and The City Churches 

The most striking architectural achievement of the new city was the reconstruction of St Paul's Cathedral and the City Churches by Christopher Wren, the preeminent architect of the English Baroque movement. Much like his masterplan for the reconstruction of the city, Wren's original design for the new St Paul's Cathedral was rejected and a compromise design had to be reached. Inspired by St. Peter's Basilica in Rome, Wren originally wanted to build a domed baroque style cathedral built in a Greek cross layout, but this design was rejected by the church as a result of the papist connotations of the Southern European design. In an act of compromise, the design that was eventually built is a hybrid design which utilises baroque ornamentation and a great dome but built on the Latin cross layout of the former gothic cathedral. Largely as a result of the awkward incorporation of a Latin cross layout in a baroque design, the overall composition of the cathedral is considered to be inferior to most comparable baroque cathedrals of the same period, but the 111-metre-high dome completed in 1710 is one of the greatest ever built, and has become one of London's most enduring landmarks; it was London's tallest building from 1710 until 1962. The main west facade with its double corinthian order and fine baroque towers is another successful feature of the exterior, with an imposing scale when viewed up Ludgate Hill.

The 51 city churches (25 of which survive) designed by Wren and his team are of great architectural significance. Stylistically they are eclectic and inventive designs, often built on small and limiting sites. Their towers are the most architecturally inventive feature of their exteriors. Among the best are the unusual tiered spire of St Bride's Fleet Street the tallest of the city churches and the tower of St Mary-le-Bow, an inventive mixture of classicism and gothic. Stylistically most of the churches are not purely baroque in style, an exception being St Stephen's Walbrook with its fine domed interior. Many of the churches such as St Peter Upon Cornhill showcase influence from Dutch classicism and Palladianism, whereas others like St Mary Aldermary are purely neo-gothic recreations of the former medieval churches, complete with a fan vaulted ceiling recalling perpendicular gothic of the late Middle Ages. Despite the architectural merit of these buildings, perhaps the most significant achievement of Wren's reconstruction of St Paul's and the city churches was their overall interaction as an ensemble. Canaletto's 1750 views of the City of London show how St Paul's and the City Churches soar above the city. The result was a picturesque skyline whose beauty astounded visitors. And so the Great Fire gave a new lease of life to the city. In the words of the architectural historian Dr Simon Thurley:

"This apparent catastrophe [...] was in reality one of the best things that ever happened to London. [...] The Great Fire of London enabled a new start - mass housing, handsome paved streets with modern churches and public buildings. There was a new Royal Exchange, a new Cathedral, a rebuilt Guildhall. London now was cleaner, more modern and more uniform than any other city in Europe [...] and it remained so until the mid 19th century."

Later architectural commissions 

Christopher Wren, the preeminent architect of this period, was tasked with the design of two new military hospitals; the Royal Hospital Chelsea for army veterans completed in 1692, and the Greenwich Hospital (latterly known as the Old Royal Naval College) completed in 1712. Royal Hospital Chelsea is one of Wren's more restrained works, with its red brick facades resembling long residential terraces. It nonetheless has a fine chapel and great hall with decorative interiors. In contrast, Old Royal Naval College with its ornate Painted Hall, St Paul's Chapel and symmetrical east and west wings that frame Queens House by Inigo Jones is widely considered the crowning glory of the English Baroque movement. Now a UNESCO World Heritage Site, the site is described as "the finest and most dramatically sited architectural ensemble and landscape ensemble in the British Isles."

Other fine examples of English Baroque are the Commissioner's Churches, 12 highly original churches built in response to a 1710 act of Parliament requesting 50 new churches in London (the further 38 were not completed). The majority of these were designed by Wren's former assistant Nicholas Hawksmoor. Hawksmoor is well known for his eccentric and idiosyncratic style that draws upon influences in Greek, Roman, Egyptian and even medieval architecture. Perhaps the most lauded and best known of these churches is Christ Church, Spitalfields (1729) which showcases his trademark blend of baroque and gothic, as well his tendency to create buildings with an imposing sense of monumentality. Other Commissioner's Churches such as St Mary-le-Strand by James Gibbs and St John's Smith Square by Thomas Archer are superlative examples of late English Baroque Architecture showing a much stronger European influence than the designs of Wren or Hawksmoor but with a distinctly English sensibility.

Georgian (1714–1811)

The Georgian era (1714–1830) saw economic and colonial expansion as Britain emerged as a global trading power with London as its centre. This is reflected in London's growth in population. The city sprawled, with substantial new development in the west of the city such as Bloomsbury, Marylebone, Mayfair and Kensington, as well as in London's Satellite villages like Hampstead, Islington, Hackney and Dulwich. This development was centred around the construction of terraces and fashionable new squares like Grosvenor Square, Portman Square and Bedford Square. These became the home of the burgeoning middle classes that emerged from Britain's new mercantile economy. With the construction of new bridges across the Thames at Westminster (1750) and Blackfriars (1769), the first since the early Middle Ages, the city began to spread significantly south of the river.

The 'Georgian' style is the British interpretation of 18th-century neoclassical architecture, derived from Palladian architecture, particularly through the Scottish architect Colen Campell. Often described as the 'Father of the Georgian style', Campell's influential book Vitruvius Britannicus set the tone for English architecture for the rest of the 18th century. This more restrained style was a reaction against the exuberant Baroque of the late 17th century, with a strict emphasis on plain unadorned brickwork, geometrical harmony and restrained classically inspired ornament. Despite this reactionary motive, Georgian architects nonetheless took great influence from Christopher Wren and other English Baroque architects. A precursor to the more unobtrusive Georgian style can be seen in the simple plain terraces built after the Great Fire at 4 King's Bench Walk in Temple or the plain brick facades of Royal Chelsea Hospital, both by Wren. Key architects of the Georgian period who designed substantial works in London include James Gibbs, Robert Adam, James Wyatt, William Kent and William Chambers.

The Georgian terraced house 

Residential houses of this era in London are distinctive for their sunken basement built on brick arch foundations, rusticated base storey, taller piano nobile reception floor and attic storey. They are generally built from buff (pale yellow) London Stock Brick to golden section proportions, often spanning triple bay frontages with 'implied' columns or pilasters and carefully proportioned and very large off-white sash windows, slate mansard roofs above an Attic pediment. They were grouped in formal garden squares, crescents and terraces with wide pavements supported on brick vaults on wide, straight public streets, often with private access to romantically landscaped gardens. Later encroachment of commercial properties has significantly reduced the width of historic streets in many parts of London, where the original plans were comparable to those found in Continental urban planning. The area of Spitalfields in East London has many extant early Georgian properties with some unusual continental features; Soho – particularly Meard Street and Westminster preserve many buildings in early Georgian style.

A typical Georgian house was designed to accommodate a single family, with front and back rooms on each floor and a partial-width rear 'closet' wing projection. The ground floor was reserved for business, the tall piano nobile for formal entertaining, and upper storeys with family bedrooms all accessed from a side stair. Servants were accommodated in the below-ground kitchen and in attic rooms in the roof. Each of the distinctions in function was subtly indicated in the decorative scheme of the façade by the sequential height of openings, projecting cornices and restrained decorative mouldings such as round-headed arches and rustication at the base and diminishing columns, sculptural capitals, balustrades and friezes expressing the top.

The Georgian townhouse 

Georgian houses in London did not just come in the form of simple terraces. Many much more sumptuous homes known as townhouses were built as city residences for the nobility and gentry as opposed to their country house or stately home. The grandest of the London townhouses were stand-alone buildings like Spencer House but some were terraced buildings such as Chandos House. In the Georgian period many of these grand houses once lined Piccadilly and Park Lane but the majority of these were demolished as they went out of fashion in the late 19th and early 20th century, including Devonshire House on Piccadilly. The few that do survive to this day include Spencer House, Burlington House, Apsley House, Chandos House, Cambridge House, Melbourne House, Marlborough House and Lancaster House. As well as this in the Greater London area a number of fine stately homes from the Georgian period can be found. These include the Palladian villa Chiswick House with landscape gardens by William Kent and Syon House with its lavish interiors by Robert Adam.

Georgian Church and Civic Architecture 

Many civic, commercial and religious structures were built in the Georgian period. Churches of the Georgian period were still very heavily influenced by the work of Christopher Wren who had pioneered the use of classical architecture in church design in England with his City Churches. But with the declining popularity of the Baroque style, Georgian church design took a more restrained Palladian approach than Wren. St Martin-in-the-Fields (1722) by James Gibbs is an archetypal church of the period, a simple neoclassical 'temple church' with restrained Palladian ornament on its exterior and a tall spire that evokes Wren's City Churches. Its format was much copied across England and abroad. Gibbs' St Peter, Vere Street (1722) is a further indicator of the increasing simplicity of church design in the 18th century.

Palladian architecture dominated civic architecture in Georgian London. This is exemplified by William Kent's Horse Guards on Whitehall (1750), an essay in austere Palladianism. Arguably the most significant secular architectural commission of Georgian London was Somerset House, a collection of government offices on the Strand that was to replace a 16th-century house of the same name on the site. The resulting building was designed by William Chambers and completed in 1776. The building is in a quadrangle around a grand courtyard. On the south side of the exterior a grand terrace overlooks the River Thames, and at ground level a watergate that would have once faced directly onto the River Thames before the construction of the Victoria Embankment.

New bridges across the River Thames were built in the Georgian period; the first bridges built in London since the early Middle Ages. These bridges included Westminster Bridge in 1750, Blackfriars Bridge in 1769 and Richmond Bridge in 1777; all were built in a neoclassical style. With the exception of Richmond Bridge, all of these bridges have now been replaced. These were highly significant as London Bridge had been the only bridge across the river for over 500 years. Their construction greatly encouraged development south of the river.

Regency (1811–1837)

London has some of the finest examples from the late-Georgian phase of British architecture known as Regency. This is aesthetically distinct from early Georgian architecture, though it continues the stylistic trend of Neoclassicism. Technically the Regency era only lasted from 1811 to 1820, when the Prince Regent ruled as proxy for his incapacitated father George III, but the distinctive trends in art and architecture extended roughly into the first 40 years of the 19th century. Regency is above all a stringent form of Classicism, directly referencing Graeco-Roman architecture. Regency employed enhanced ornamentation like friezes with high and low relief figural or vegetative motifs, statuary, urns, and porticos, all the while keeping the clean lines and symmetry of early Georgian architecture. Typically Georgian features like sash windows were retained, along with first-floor balconies, which became especially popular in the Regency period, with either delicate cast iron scrollwork or traditional balusters. The most noticeable difference between early Georgian and Regency architecture is the covering of previously exposed brick façades with stucco painted in cream tones to imitate marble or natural stone. John Nash was the leading proponent of Regency Classicism, and some of his finest works survive in London. These include the grand residential terraces surrounding Regent's Park: Cumberland Terrace, Cambridge Terrace, Park Square, and Park Crescent. Nash's heavy use of stucco on these buildings was often deceptive, as it could serve to obscure inferior-quality construction: Nash had a financial interest in the Regent's Park developments.

The designs for the other Regent's Park terraces (Cornwall, Clarence and York) were entrusted to Decimus Burton, an architect who specialised in Greek Revival. These terraces employ all the signature features of Regency Classicism: imposing, temple-like frontages covered in gleaming stucco with projecting porches, porticos with Corinthian or Ionic capitals, large pediments, and figural friezes extending along the upper part of the façades. Burton's design for the Athenaeum Club (1830) on Pall Mall, whose sculptural frieze was modelled on the recently acquired Elgin Marbles in the British Museum, is another splendid example. Close to the Athenaeum, Nash designed what has been called "London's finest Regency terrace", Carlton House Terrace (1829), on the site of Carlton House. It had been demolished in 1826 after the new King, George IV, moved to Buckingham Palace, and Nash was employed to design the three-house terrace in his signature, rigidly Classical style: clad in stucco, with an imposing Corinthian portico, balconies, pediments, and Attic parapet, over a podium with squat Doric columns.

Nash's most defining association was with the Prince Regent, his greatest patron. The most enduring legacy of this relationship is Buckingham Palace, which was transformed from the modest Buckingham House of George III's reign into a grand Neoclassical palace to Nash's designs. Beginning in 1825, Nash extended the house westwards and added two flanking wings, creating an open forecourt, or Cour d'honneur, facing St. James's Park. The style is similar to Nash's terraces on the edges of Regents Park, except that the Palace was built in golden-hued Bath stone instead of stucco-faced brick. The front façade of the main block features a two-storey porch of Doric columns on the bottom, tall fluted Corinthian columns above, with a pediment topped by statuary and adorned in high-relief sculpture. All the hallmarks of Regency Neoclassicism appear, including an encompassing frieze with vegetative scrollwork of Coade stone, balconies accessible from the first floor, and an attic with figural sculptures based on the Elgin Marbles. The west front overlooking the main garden features a bay window at its centre, with a long terrace with balustrades and large Classical urns made of Coade stone. Preceding the forecourt was a monumental Roman arch, modelled on the Arc de Triomphe du Carrousel in Paris, which currently stands as the Marble Arch at the north-eastern corner of Hyde Park. The addition of the East Wing early in the reign of Queen Victoria enclosed the forecourt and created the frontage of Buckingham Palace known ever since, but the bulk of the Palace exterior remains from Nash's Regency additions, particularly the long garden front on the west side.

Contemporaneous to Nash's building work in Regent's Park and St. James', the development of Belgravia further west offers the most uniform and extensive example of Regency architecture in London in the form of Belgrave Square, Eaton Square, Wilton Crescent and Chester Square. An ultra-exclusive housing development built on a formerly rural swathe of land on the Grosvenor Estate, building was entrusted to Thomas Cubitt and began in 1825 with Belgrave Square; the three main squares were completed and occupied by the 1840s. Like Nash, Cubitt designed elegant Classical terraces,. All were covered in white-painted stucco, with the entrance to each house featuring projecting Doric porches supporting first floor balconies with tall pedimented windows, and attics resting on cornice-work in the Greek manner.

The Regency period saw the construction of some of London's finest neoclassical churches, many of which are known as Commissioner's Churches. A Commissioners' church is an Anglican church built with money voted by Parliament via the Church Building Acts of 1818 and 1824. The 1818 Act supplied a grant of money and established the Church Building Commission to direct its use, and in 1824 made a further grant. The First Parliamentary Grant for churches amounted to £1 million (equivalent to £73,550,000 in 2019). The Second Parliamentary Grant of 1824 amounted to an additional £500,000 (£44,320,000 in 2019). Commissioner's churches in London include All Souls, Langham Place by John Nash: its circular tower was deliberately placed on a bend on Nash's Regents Street to create a picturesque view from Oxford Circus, the fine neoclassical St Mary's, Bryanston Square by Robert Smirke and St Luke's, Chelsea one of London's first Gothic-revival churches: an early indication of the shift away from neoclassicism that followed later in the 19th century. Other fine Regency churches include St Pancras New Church (1822) by William and Henry Inwood: one of the most authentic Greek-revival church in London complete with a replica of the 'porch of the maidens' from the Erechtheion temple in Athens and St Marylebone Parish Church (1819) by Thomas Hardwick with a tower crowned with gilded angels.

Victorian (1837−1901)

Buildings from the Victorian era (1837–1901) and their diverse range of forms and ornamentation are the single largest group from any architectural period in London. The Victorian era saw unprecedented urbanisation and growth in London, coinciding with Britain's ascendancy in the world economy and London's global pre-eminence as the first metropolis of the modern world. As the political centre of the world's largest Empire and the trading and financial hub of the Pax Britannica, London's architecture reflects the affluence of the period.

As London grew during the 19th century, the former compact, close proximity of different social classes in the City of London transformed into a taste for specially developed suburbs for specific classes of the population. This is reflected in styles of domestic and commercial architecture. Donald Olsen wrote in The Growth of Victorian London that "the shift from multi-purpose to single-purpose neighborhoods reflected the pervasive move towards professionalization and specialization in all aspects of nineteenth-century thought and activity."

Gothic Revival 

The single most pervasive style of architecture was Neo-Gothic, also called Gothic Revival, embodied by the new Palace of Westminster built to designs by Charles Barry between 1840 and 1876. Gothic architecture embodied "the influence of London's past" and coincided with Romanticism, a cultural movement which glorified all things medieval. The evangelism prevalent in mid-century Britain was also a factor in favouring Gothic Revival, which referenced great English cathedrals like Ely and Salisbury. New churches were constructed to exuberant and ornate Gothic Revival designs to imitate the great cathedrals of the past. The finest of these include All Saints church in Fitzrovia, the French-Gothic St Augustine's, Kilburn designed by John Loughborough Pearson (founded 1870), St Mary Magdalene, Paddington, and St Cuthbert's, Earls Court, designed by Hugh Roumieu Gough and built between 1884 and 1887. St. Cuthbert's, according to English Heritage, has "one of the most lavish and consistent [interior] schemes in any Victorian church" and is "one of the richest ecclesiastical interiors in London." Modelled in its proportions after Tintern Abbey, and packed with decoration in marble, stone, wrought iron, and oak, the masterpiece of St. Cuthbert's is the 50-foot high wooden reredos carved in an elaborate late-Gothic Spanish style. The leading proponents of Gothic Revival were Augustus Pugin, entrusted with the interior design of the Palace of Westminster, and John Ruskin, an influential art critic.

Hallmarks of Gothic architecture are tracery, a form of delicate, web-like ornamentation for windows, parapets, and all external ornamentation. Symmetry of lines, pointed arches, spires, and steep roofs are other characteristics. Cast iron, and from the mid-19th century mild steel, were used in Gothic revival iron structures like Blackfriars Bridge (1869) and St Pancras railway station (1868). Other significant buildings built in Gothic Revival are the Royal Courts of Justice (1882), the Midland Grand Hotel (1876) adjoining St Pancras station, Liverpool Street railway station (1875), and the Albert Memorial (1872) in Kensington Gardens. Even the suburbs were built in derivative Gothic Revival styles, called "Wimbledon Gothic".

The Industrial Revolution: railway and iron-framed architecture 

The Industrial Revolution which began in Britain in the late 18th and early 19th century created a great deal of new building types and infrastructure that were a product of the new industries and technologies that it produced. The most obvious example of this was the arrival of the railways which greatly transformed the cityscape and structure of London. The first railway to be built in London was the London and Greenwich Railway, a short line from London Bridge to Greenwich, which opened in 1836. This was soon followed by great rail termini which linked London to every corner of Britain. These included Euston station (1837), Paddington station (1838), Fenchurch Street station (1841), Waterloo station (1848), King's Cross station (1852), and St Pancras station (1868). London also became the first city in the world to have an underground railway system. With traffic congestion on London's roads becoming more and more serious, proposals for underground railways to ease the pressure on street traffic were first mooted in the 1840s, after the opening of the Thames Tunnel in 1843 proved such engineering work could be done successfully. Begun in 1860 and completed in 1863, the Metropolitan Railway inaugurated the world's oldest mass transit system, the London Underground; it was created by the cut-and-cover method of excavating a trench from above, then building reinforced brick walls and vaults to form the tunnel, and filling in the trench with earth. Some of the original underground station architecture from the Metropolitan Railway still survives at Baker Street tube station complete with a brick arched roof with vents to ventilate the steam from the original Victorian locomotives.

Advancements in engineering during the industrial revolution made available the use of new building materials such as iron, enabling its use to build the first iron-framed structures in history. Iron beams afforded unprecedented span and height in new buildings, with the added advantage of being fireproof. The greatest embodiment of iron's possibilities was found in Joseph Paxton's Crystal Palace, a 990,000-square-foot (9.2-hectare) exhibition hall made of cast iron and plate glass, which opened in 1851. Before that, iron was already being used to gird the roofs of the King's Library in the British Museum, built between 1823 and 1827, the Reform Club (1837–1841), Travellers Club (1832), and the new Palace of Westminster. The technological advancements pioneered with the Crystal Palace would be applied to the building of London's great railway termini in the latter half of the century: St. Pancras, Liverpool Street, Paddington, King's Cross, and Victoria. London Paddington had already set the model for train stations built with iron support piers and framework, when it was completed in 1854 to the designs of the greatest of Victorian engineers, Isambard Kingdom Brunel.

Victorian domestic styles 

London's great expansion in the 19th Century was driven by housing growth to accommodate the rapidly expanding population of the city. The growth of road building and the railways in this period fueled the outward expansion of suburbs, as did a cultural impetus to escape the inner city, allowing the world's of 'work' and 'life' to be separate. Suburbs varied enormously in character and in the relative wealth of their inhabitants, with some being for the very wealthy, and others being for the lower-middle classes. They frequently imitated the success of earlier periods of speculative housing development from the Georgian era, although the Victorian Era saw a much wider array of suburban housing built in London. Terraced, semi-detached and detached housing all developed in a multitude of styles and typologies, with an almost endless variation in the layout of streets, gardens, homes, and decorative elements.

Early in the Victorian era, up to the 1840s houses were influenced by the classicism of Regency architecture. However, the simplicity of Regency classicism fell out of favour as affluence increased and by the 1850s the Italianate style influenced domestic architecture which now incorporated varying quantities of stucco. From the 1850s domestic buildings became increasingly influenced by the Gothic Revival, incorporating features such as pointed, projecting porches, bay windows, and grey slate. This progressive change in style resulted from several factors. In the 1850s, the abolition of tax on glass and bricks made these items cheaper, while suitable materials and the coming of the railways allowed them to be manufactured elsewhere, at low cost and to standard sizes and methods, and brought to site. From the 1850s, building regulations were progressively introduced.

Late Victorian revival styles 

Although Victorian architecture is most closely associated with the Gothic Revival, many other historicist styles were also popular during the Victorian Era, particularly towards the end of the 19th century as Gothic Revival began to wane in popularity. These included Renaissance Revival, British Queen Anne Revival, Moorish Revival, Byzantine Revival, Romanesque Revival, Italianate and Neoclassicism, as well as buildings that often mixed a variety of these different historical influences in a manner that transcended stylistic category. New styles not based on revivals of historic architecture were also avidly adopted, like that of the Second Empire copied from France in the 1870s.

Perhaps the most unique new style to emerge in the late 19th century was the Arts and Crafts Movement. Somewhat mirroring and taking influence from The Art Nouveau style then prominent in Europe, the Arts and Crafts movement articulated itself as a reaction against the changes brought about by the industrial revolution, embracing traditional craftsmanship and decorative motifs inspired by romanticism, medievalism and nature. The most prolific architect of the style in London was Charles Harrison Townsend who designed the Horniman Museum (1900) and the Whitechapel Gallery (1900): two highly unique and unorthodox buildings described by Nicholaus Pevsner as "without question the most remarkable example of a reckless repudiation of tradition among English architects of the time" This experimentalism of the Arts and Crafts Movement made it an important formative influence on Modernist Architecture in Britain during the early 20th century.

Perhaps the most significant development in the use of building materials in the late 19th century was the use of terracotta as a decorative appliqué on the outer facade of buildings. Entire buildings were covered in elaborately moulded terracotta tiles, like the Natural History Museum (1880), the rebuilt Harrods department store (1895–1905), and the Prudential Assurance Building at Holborn Bars (1885–1901). Terracotta was advantageous in that it was colourful and did not absorb the heavy air pollution of Victorian London, unlike brick and stone. As Ben Weinreb described terracotta's usage: "it found the greatest favour on the brasher, self-advertising types of building such as shops, theatres, pubs and the larger City offices."

Despite the explosive growth of Victorian London and the scale of much of the building that had taken place, by the 1880s and 1890s there was an increasing belief that London's urban fabric was inferior to other European cities and unsuitable for the capital of the world's largest empire. There was little coherent urban planning in London during the Victorian era, apart from major infrastructure projects like the construction of the railways, Thames Embankment and Tower Bridge. Critics compared London to cities like Paris and Vienna, where state intervention and large scale demolition had created a more regular arrangement, with broad boulevards, panoramas and architectural uniformity. London was "visibly the bastion of private property rights", which accounted for the eclecticism of its buildings. This motivated developments such as The Mall and Admiralty Arch in the Edwardian period, in an attempt to create an image of imperial splendour and pageantry.

Edwardian Architecture (1901–1914)

The dawn of the 20th century and the death of Queen Victoria (1901) saw a shift in architectural taste and a reaction against Victorianism. The popularity of Neoclassicism, dormant during the latter half of the 19th century, revived with the new styles of Beaux-Arts and Edwardian Baroque, also called the "Grand Manner" or "Wrenaissance", for the influence that Wren's work had on this movement. Neoclassical architecture suited an "Imperial City" like London because it evoked the grandeur of the Roman Empire and was monumental in scale. Trademarks include rusticated stonework, banded columns or quoins of alternating smooth and rusticated stonework, exaggerated voussoirs for arched openings, free-standing columns or semi-engaged pilasters with either Corinthian or Ionic capitals, and domed roofs with accompanying corner domes or elaborate cupolas. In adopting such styles, British architects evoked hallowed English Baroque structures like St. Paul's Cathedral and Inigo Jones' Banqueting House. Municipal, government, and ecclesiastical buildings of the years 1900–1914 avidly adopted Neo-Baroque architecture for large construction works like the Old Bailey (1902), County Hall (begun in 1911), the Port of London Authority building (begun 1912), the War Office (1906), and Methodist Central Hall (1911).

The most impressive commercial buildings constructed during the Edwardian era include the Ritz Hotel on Piccadilly (1906), Norman Shaw's Piccadilly Hotel (1905), Selfridges department store (1909), and Whiteleys department store (1911). All of these were built in variations of Neoclassicism: Beaux-Arts, Neo-Baroque, or Louis XVI. The firm of Mewès & Davis, partners who were alumni of the École des Beaux-Arts, specialised in 18th century French architecture, specifically Louis XVI. This is evident in the Ritz Hotel and Inveresk House, the headquarters of the Morning Post, on Aldwych.

The popularity of terracotta for exterior cladding waned in favour of glazed ceramic tiles known as glazed architectural terracotta (often called "faience" at the time). Outstanding examples include the Strand Palace Hotel (1909) and Regent Palace Hotel (1914), both clad in cream-coloured 'Marmo' tiles manufactured by Burmantofts Pottery; Michelin House (1911); and Debenham House (1907). London Underground stations built during the Edwardian years, namely those on the Piccadilly Line and Bakerloo Line, all employ glazed tile cladding designed by Leslie Green. The signature features of these stations are glazed oxblood red tiles for the station exteriors, ticket halls clad in green and white tiles, and platforms decorated in individual colour themes varying between stations. Glazed tiles had the added advantages of being easy to clean and impervious to London's polluted atmosphere.

The two most important architectural accomplishments in London during the Edwardian years were the building of Kingsway and the creation of an enormous processional route stretching from Buckingham Palace to St. Paul's Cathedral. A grand parade route for state pageantry, a common feature of European cities, was felt to be sadly lacking in London. To accomplish this a group of buildings standing between The Mall and Trafalgar Square were demolished and replaced with the grand Neo-Baroque edifice of Admiralty Arch. This created one grand east–west parade route encompassing Buckingham Palace, Trafalgar Square via Admiralty Arch, then connecting with the newly widened Strand, and thence to Fleet Street. In 1913 the decaying Caen stone on the façade of Buckingham Palace, blackened by pollution and deteriorating, was replaced with a more impressive facing of Portland stone.

This involved the clearance of a notorious Holborn slum known as Clare Market, between Covent Garden and Lincoln's Inn Fields. The demolition destroyed buildings dating back to the Elizabethan era, some of the few to have survived the Great Fire. In its place Kingsway and Aldwych were constructed, the latter a crescent-shaped road connecting the Strand to Kingsway. The north side of the Strand was demolished, allowing the street to be widened and more impressive and architecturally sound buildings to be constructed. Lining these grand new boulevards were impressive new theatres, hotels, and diplomatic commissions in imposing Neoclassical, Portland stone-clad designs. These new buildings included the headquarters of Britain's most important imperial possessions: India House, Australia House, with South Africa House built in the 1930s opposite Trafalgar Square. There were plans to demolish two churches along the Strand, St Mary le Strand and St Clement Danes, the latter designed by Sir Christopher Wren, because they were protruding into the street and causing traffic congestion. After public outcry the Strand was instead widened to go round these churches, creating 'islands' in the middle.

Steel

In the first decade of the 20th century, the use of steel to reinforce new buildings advanced tremendously. Steel piers had been used in isolation to support the National Liberal Club (1886) and the rebuilt Harrods department store (1905). The extension of 1904–05 to the Savoy Hotel used steel framing for the whole construction, followed closely by the Ritz Hotel (1906); the latter gained popular reputation as the first building in London to be steel-framed. The abundance of domes in the Edwardian period is partly attributable to steel girders, which made large domes lighter, cheaper to build, and easier to engineer.

Selfridges on Oxford Street, modelled after American-style department stores, was the true watershed, because its size was unprecedented by British standards and far exceeded existing building regulations. To gain planning approval, Selfridge's architect Sven Bylander (the engineer responsible for the Ritz) worked closely with the London County Council (LCC) to update the LCC's woefully outdated regulations on the use of steel, dating back to 1844. In 1907 he gained approval for his plans, and by 1909, when Selfridges opened, the LCC passed the LCC (General Powers) Act (the Steel Act), which provided comprehensive guidelines for steel-framed buildings and a more streamlined process for gaining planning permission. By this point, steel reinforcement was de rigueur in any sizable public or commercial building, as seen in the new buildings proliferating along Aldwych and Kingsway.

Art Deco & Interwar Architecture (1919–1939)

After the end of World War I, several outstanding building projects begun before 1914 were finally completed. The sombre mood and straitened financial circumstances of interwar Britain made the flamboyant Neo-Baroque style no longer suitable for new architecture. Instead, British architects turned back to the austere, clean lines of Georgian Architecture for inspiration. Consequently, Neo-Georgian was the preferred style for municipal and government architecture well into the 1960s. The sale and demolition of many of London's grandest aristocratic houses gave rise to some of the largest private building projects of the interwar period, built to Art Deco or Neo-Georgian designs. These include The Dorchester (Art Deco) and the Grosvenor House Hotel (Neo-Georgian) on Park Lane, both on the sites of grand London houses of the same names. Many buildings clustered around Georgian squares in central London were demolished and replaced, ironically enough, with Neo-Georgian edifices in near-identical styles but larger. Grosvenor Square, the most exclusive of London's squares, saw the demolition of original Georgian buildings in favour of the uniform Neo-Georgian townhouses which currently surround the square on the north, east and south sides. In St James's Square several buildings were demolished and rebuilt in the Neo-Georgian style, including Norfolk House.

Neo-Classical architecture remained popular for large building projects in London, but it dispensed with the heavy ornamentation and bold proportions of the Baroque. It remained the preferred style for banks, financial houses, and associations seeking to communicate prestige and authority. Perhaps the most prominent example of interwar Neoclassicism is the rebuilt Bank of England in the City of London, designed by Sir Herbert Baker and built between 1921 and 1937. The most influential proponent of Neoclassicism in interwar Britain was Sir Edwin Lutyens. His distinctive form of Neoclassicism can be seen in London with the Cenotaph, the monolithic, streamlined war memorial built of Portland stone on Whitehall; the Midland Bank building; and Britannic House in Finsbury Circus, both in the City of London, and the headquarters of the British Medical Association in Tavistock Square, Bloomsbury. In Westminster, a fine example of interwar Neoclassicism is Devonshire House, an office building constructed between 1924 and 1926 on the site of the former London house of the Dukes of Devonshire. Classicism of this style was almost exclusively executed in the ever-popular Portland stone.

Art Deco Architecture

Existing alongside the more prevalent Neo-Georgian and Neoclassical forms of architecture used in the capital in the 1920s and 1930s, Art Deco was nonetheless an extremely popular style from about 1925 to the later 1930s. The true stimulus was the 1925 International Exhibition of Modern Decorative and Industrial Arts in Paris, where Art Deco had been developed roughly 20 years earlier. London, alongside New York City and Paris, became an innovative and experimental ground for Art Deco architecture. This is defined by clean lines, curves, geometric patterns, bold colour, and elaborate, stylised sculptural accents. Art Deco was adopted most enthusiastically by "modern" businesses and those seeking to advertise their modernity and forward-thinking attitude. These included cinemas, media headquarters, airports, swimming pools, factories, and power stations (such as Battersea Power Station). It was a flashy, luxurious style, so it was well adapted for department stores (e.g. Simpsons of Piccadilly), theatres, hotels, and blocks of flats.

Two of London's finest examples of Art Deco architecture stand on Fleet Street: The Daily Telegraph building (1928) and the Daily Express building. The façade of the latter is, unusually for the time, composed entirely of glass, vitrolite and chromium, which stood out boldly amongst the stone and brick architecture of Fleet Street. The use of industrial, sleek materials like these was more common in Deco buildings in New York City than it was in London: Portland stone remained overwhelmingly the material of choice. For example, another media headquarters, the BBC's Broadcasting House on Portland Place, was built in the traditional Portland stone with outstanding figural sculptures by Eric Gill. Ideal House (1929), is highly unusual in combining Art Deco with Egyptian motifs, on a façade clad in shiny black granite. Another Art Deco/Egyptian synthesis is the Carreras Cigarette Factory in Mornington Crescent.

The erection of ultra-modern Deco buildings often came at the expense of older architectural gems, some irreplaceable. Along the Embankment two large Deco buildings were constructed which continue to dominate London's riverfront profile. The elegant Neoclassical Adelphi Buildings, designed by Robert and John Adam and built between 1768 and 1771, were demolished to build the New Adelphi office building in the 1930s.

Arguably the most prolific Art Deco architect in London was Charles Holden, who received a large number of commissions by London Transport, including arguably London's first skyscraper 55 Broadway (1929) and several tube stations built in a distinctive modernist/art deco style like Southgate tube station (1933). His other high rise commission the 19-storey Senate House, headquarters of the University of London, is the tallest Art Deco structure in London and was one of the tallest buildings in London when finished in 1937. It elicited, and continues to elicit, much criticism because it stands so tall and obtrusive amongst the modest Georgian squares of Bloomsbury. Evelyn Waugh described it as a "vast bulk...insulting the autumnal sky", while more recent critics have called it Stalinesque or reminiscent of the Third Reich. This association with totalitarian architecture was reinforced by the wartime rumour that Hitler wanted the Senate House for his London headquarters upon conquering Britain, and therefore ordered Luftwaffe bombers to avoid it during The Blitz.

Post-War Modernism and Brutalism (1945–1980)

In the Blitz, London's urban fabric and infrastructure was devastated by continuous aerial bombardment by the Luftwaffe with almost 20,000 civilians killed and more than a million houses destroyed or damaged. Hundreds of thousands of citizens had been evacuated to safer areas, and the reconstruction of a habitable urban environment became a national emergency. The re-housing crisis, aligned with post-War optimism manifested in the Welfare State, afforded an opportunity and a duty for the architectural profession to rebuild the shattered capital. The internationally influential urban planner Sir Patrick Abercrombie established the 1943 County of London Plan, which set out redevelopment according to modernist principles of zoning and de-densification of historic urban areas. Accelerating pre-war trends, overcrowded urban populations were relocated to new suburban developments, allowing inner-city areas to be reconstructed. The Golden Lane Estate, followed by the Barbican by Chamberlin, Powell and Bon, are regarded as casebook examples of urban reconstruction of the period in the City of London, where just 5,324 local residents had remained by the end of the war.

The 1951 Festival of Britain, held on London's South Bank, became an important cultural landmark in sharing and disseminating optimism for future progress. The Royal Festival Hall (built 1948–1951) and the later South Bank Centre including the Hayward Gallery (1968), Queen Elizabeth Hall/Purcell Room (1967) and the Royal National Theatre (1976) remain as significant architectural and cultural legacies of the era.

London had attracted a select group of European modernists, some as refugees from Nazism, and the post-war era presented opportunities for many to express their unique visions for modernism. European architects of the era include Berthold Lubetkin and Ernő Goldfinger, who employed and trained architects on modernist social housing such as the Dorset Estate of 1957, Alexander Fleming House (1962–64), Balfron Tower of 1963 and Trellick Tower of 1966, as well as Keeling House by Denys Lasdun in 1957.
International movements in architecture and urban planning were reflected in the new developments with separation of motor transportation and industrial and commercial uses from living areas, according to the prevailing orthodoxies of the CIAM. High-rise residential developments of council housing in London were above all else influenced by Le Corbusier's Unité d'habitation (or Cité Radieuse ("Radiant City") of 1947–52. The architecture of post war modernism was informed by ideals of technological progress and social progress through egalitarianism; this was expressed by humanistic repetition of forms and use of the modernist material par excellence – Béton brut or 'raw concrete'.
Significant council housing works in London include the Brunswick Centre (1967–72) by Patrick Hodgkinson and the Alexandra Road Estate (1972–78) by Neave Brown of the Camden Council architects department.

The British exponents of the internationalist movement were headed by Alison and Peter Smithson, originally as part of Team 10; they went on to design Robin Hood Gardens (1972) in Bow and The Economist Building (1962–64) in Mayfair, regarded by architects as some of the very finest works of British New Brutalism.Many schools, residential housing and public buildings were built over the period; however the failure of some the modernist ideals, coupled with poor quality of construction and poor maintenance by building owners, has resulted in a negative popular perception of the architecture of the era; this is being transformed and expressed in the enduring value and prestige of refurbished developments such as the Barbican, Trellick Tower and Balfron Tower, regarded by many as architectural "icons" of a distant era of heroic social constructivism and highly sought-after places of residence.

The postwar period saw the first commercial skyscrapers in London. These were typically built in the corporate International Style, closely associated with the modernist pioneer Ludwig Mies van der Rohe, following the simple glass cuboid format of van der Rohe's Seagram Building (1958). Examples include New Zealand House (1960), Millbank Tower (1963), St Helen's (1970) and Euston Tower (1970). Two high-rise office buildings built in the period were designed by the architect George Marsh: Centre Point (1966) and One Kemble Street (1968). Each has a distinctive facade made up of a mosaic of interlocking concrete blocks and large windows, creating an interesting blend of the International Style and Brutalism. They are both now Grade II listed in recognition of their architectural merit.

Postmodernism, High-Tech and High-Rise (1980-Present)

Postmodern and High Tech 

The late 1970s is considered to be a stylistic turning point in the history of architecture. Formed in reaction against the austere modernism which had dominated architectural design since the end of world war II, the postmodern school - which first expressed itself in the controversial book Learning from Las Vegas (1973) by Robert Venturi  - was a movement that rejected minimalism by embracing irony, playfulness, pop culture and quoting historical styles in their buildings. The result was an eccentric new style that couldn't be in starker contrast to the rigid post war consensus of the international style. London has some postmodern architecture, mostly from the 1990s. Robert Venturi's Salisbury Wing of the National Gallery (1991) is a postmodern historical pastiche, built of Portland stone and ironically imitating the neoclassical style to blend in with the older building. Two of the postmodern movement's most influential architects, Terry Farrell and James Stirling, were British and many of their works are in London. Farrell's SIS Building or MI6 Building (1996) in Vauxhall is a distinctive pyramidal design influenced by Maya and Aztec architecture. James Stirling's No.1 Poultry (1997) has been commended as a masterpiece of the postmodernist style; it was grade II* listed in 2016. Its design incorporates a pink terracotta façade with equestrian sculptures and a clock tower resembling a submarine's conning tower. It replaced a neo-gothic building of the 19th century.

A splinter of the postmodern movement that became prominent in the 1990s is the high-tech style and the similar neo-futurist style. These two styles embrace much of the eccentricity of postmodern style with unusual forms, whilst taking cues from the modernist movement with functionality and utopianism. In terms of construction there is an emphasis on the usage of glass, steel and high-tech production processes, as well as exposing the structural and utilitarian elements of the building as a means of decoration. A revolutionary example is the Lloyd's building (1986) by Richard Rogers, an 'inside-out' design in which all the building's utilities – its lifts, ducts and vents – are on the outside, acting as a façade. The building is Grade I listed. The high-tech became associated with Norman Foster. Significant high-tech works by Foster include The Great Court of the British Museum; a distinctive glass dome structure built over the central courtyard of the original 19th century building, City Hall (2002) on the South Bank with its distinctive ovular shape and the iconic skyscraper 30 St Mary Axe (2003), dubbed 'The Gherkin', and winning the Stirling Prize and a 2006 poll as the most admired building by the world's leading architects. Many buildings followed suit, such as The Shard (2012), 122 Leadenhall Street (2014) 20 Fenchurch Street (2015) and 1 Blackfriars (2018).

Contemporary high rise 

Its height was controversial, being contrary to the previous height restrictions; it was the tallest building in the United Kingdom at the time and the tallest cantilever building in the world. The development's main tower One Canada Square became the tallest building in the United Kingdom.

Boris Johnson, Mayor of London from 2008 to 2016, approved more skyscrapers in London. In 2014, the  122 Leadenhall Street, nicknamed "the Cheesegrater", was completed in the City of London.

It is the tallest skyscraper currently proposed for London and will only be exceeded in height by The Shard. However, construction was halted after concerns that the building only had one escape stairwell for residents on the upper floors. The tallest of the two Riverside South towers that have been planned for construction at Canary Wharf since 2008 would have exceeded that cluster's tallest building, One Canada Square, by 1 metre in height, but construction has been stalled since 2011.

Another major skyscraper cluster has emerged in the Vauxhall and Nine Elms districts south of the river Thames. The tallest tower planned for this cluster is the  One Nine Elms City Tower.

In 2019, Sadiq Khan blocked the construction of the 290 metre tall Tulip that would have been built in the City of London. However, the developers of the tower have appealed the decision.

See also 
 List of tallest buildings and structures in London
 List of demolished buildings and structures in London

References

Sources
 Marianne Butler, London Architecture, metropublications, 2006
 Billings, Henrietta, Brutalist London Map, Blue Crow Media, 2015

External links 
 
 Architecture of London From Archiseek.com
 Architecture of London Projects from Design Architecture Limited
 Brutalist Architecture in London from Blue crow media
 Art Deco Architecture in London from Blue crow media

 
London
History of the built environment of London